Mario Prunas (died on 19 August 1982) was an Italian diplomat.

He was a nephew of diplomat  (born 21 June 1892 in Cagliari, died on 25 December 1951 in Cairo), Secretary General of the Ministry of Foreign Affairs from 1943 until 1946.

Biography
From 1955 to 1963 he was second class delegation secretary in Cairo, where he was accredited on 7 October 1959 as a delegation councilor.

From 1974 to 1978 he was Italian ambassador to Bangkok.

From 1979 to 1983 he was Italian ambassador to Stockholm.

See also 
 Ministry of Foreign Affairs (Italy)
 Foreign relations of Italy

References

Ambassadors of Italy to Sweden
Ambassadors of Italy to Thailand
Italian diplomats